Judge Griffin may refer to:

Cyrus Griffin (1748–1810), judge of the United States District Court for the District of Virginia
Frank Griffin (judge) (1919–2016), judge of the Supreme Court of Ireland
Jefferson G. Griffin (fl. 2010s–2020s), judge of the North Carolina Court of Appeals
Jürgen Griffin, fictional character from Judge Dredd media
Marc Griffin (born 1956), American lawyer who became the world's youngest judge at age 17 in 1974
Richard Allen Griffin (born 1952), judge of the United States Court of Appeals for the Sixth Circuit

See also
Justice Griffin (disambiguation)